Elizabeth Metcalf (August 28, 1921 – June 23, 2017) was an American clinical psychologist and former politician in the state of Florida. Metcalf was born in New Jersey and moved to Florida 1962. A clinical psychologist, she was an alumnus of the Swarthmore College, Yale University, and the University of Iowa. She served in the Florida House of Representatives from 1982 to 1988 for district 114. She was a member of the Democratic Party. Metcalf died on 23 June 2017, aged 95.

References

1921 births
2017 deaths
People from Coral Gables, Florida
People from Carneys Point Township, New Jersey
Yale University alumni
University of Iowa alumni
Swarthmore College alumni
American clinical psychologists
Democratic Party members of the Florida House of Representatives
Women state legislators in Florida
21st-century American women